Laurence F. "Frank" Malone (1903 – 2 September 1953) was an Irish Gaelic footballer who played as a left corner-back for the Kildare senior team. 

Malone made his debut during the 1926 championship and was a regular member of the starting fifteen during the golden age of Kildare football. During that time he won two All-Ireland medals and six Leinster medals. Higgins was an All-Ireland runner-up on three occasions.

At club level Malone was a six-time county club championship medalist with Naas.

References

1903 births
1953 deaths
Kildare inter-county Gaelic footballers
Naas Gaelic footballers
Winners of two All-Ireland medals (Gaelic football)